The 1898 Cornell Big Red football team was an American football team that represented Cornell University during the 1898 college football season.  In their second season under head coach Pop Warner, the Big Red compiled a 10–2 record and outscored all opponents by a combined total of 296 to 29. Three Cornell players received honors on the 1898 College Football All-America Team: tackle Edwin Sweetland (Walter Camp-3); guard Daniel A. Reed, Cornell (Camp-3, Leslie's Weekly-2); and halfback Allen E. Whiting, Cornell (Outing-2, Leslie's-2).

Schedule

References

Cornell
Cornell Big Red football seasons
Cornell Big Red football